The Wedding Video may refer to two films:

The Wedding Video (2003 film), an American mockumentary
The Wedding Video (2012 film), a British comedy film